Rylands is an English surname. Notable people with the surname include:

Dadie Rylands (1902–1999), British literary scholar and theatre director
Dave Rylands (born 1953), English footballer
Enriqueta Augustina Rylands (1843–1908), English philanthropist
George Rylands, real name of 'Dadie' Rylands (above)
John Rylands (1801–1888), English textile merchant and philanthropist
John Paul Rylands (1846–1923), English lawyer, genealogist and topographer
Mark Rylands (born 1961), Church of England bishop
Patrick Rylands (born 1943), English designer
Peter Rylands (1820–1887), English wire manufacturer and politician
Sir William Rylands (1868–1948), British businessman

See also
Ryland (disambiguation)
The John Rylands Library in Manchester
The John Rylands University Library in Manchester
In St Breward parish, Cornwall, is a hamlet called Rylands
The southern part of the town of Beeston, Nottinghamshire is called Rylands
Warrington Rylands, English football team from Warrington